Beadle County is a county in the U.S. state of South Dakota. As of the 2020 United States Census, the population was 19,149. Its county seat is Huron. The county was created in 1879 and organized in 1880. Beadle County comprises the Huron, SD Micropolitan Statistical Area.

History
Beadle County, named for Brigadier General William Henry Harrison Beadle, was created by the Dakota Territory Legislature in 1879, and was organized in 1880 with the appointment of three county commissioners by Governor Nehemiah G. Ordway. The first town within Beadle County was Cavour, but Huron was named the county seat when the county commissioners first met there in July 1880.

Geography
The James River flows south-southeastward through the eastern central part of Beadle County. The terrain of Beadle County consists of low rolling hills, sloping toward the river valley. The county's highest point is its SW corner, at 1,841' (561m) ASL. Its lowest point is on the south boundary line, where James River flows into adjacent Sanborn County, at 1,230' (375m) ASL.

Major highways

  U.S. Highway 14
  U.S. Highway 281
  South Dakota Highway 28
  South Dakota Highway 37

Adjacent counties

 Spink County - north
 Clark County - northeast
 Kingsbury County - east
 Sanborn County - southeast
 Jerauld County - southwest
 Hand County - west

Protected areas

 Bob Roe Memorial State Game Production Area
 Brecken Slough State Game Production Area
 Cavour Lake State Game Production Area
 James River School State game Production Area
 Lake Byron Hogsback State Game Production Area
 Mallard Slough State Game Production Area
 Mud Lake State Game Production Area
 North Byron State Game Production Area
 Norwegian/Borden State Game Production Area
 Pheasant Country State Game Production Area
 Sand Creek State Game Production Area
 South Byron State Game Production Area
 South James River State Game Production Area
 Staum Dam State Game Production Area
 Third Street Dam State Game Production Area
 Upper Cain Creek State Game Production Area

Demographics

2000 census
As of the 2000 United States Census, there were 17,023 people, 7,210 households, and 4,535 families in the county. The population density was 14 people per square mile (5/km2). There were 8,206 housing units at an average density of 6 per square mile (3/km2). The racial makeup of the county was 96.93% White, 0.69% Black or African American, 0.95% Native American, 0.31% Asian, 0.02% Pacific Islander, 0.26% from other races, and 0.85% from two or more races. 0.91% of the population were Hispanic or Latino of any race. 49.9% were of German, 11.7% Norwegian, 6.1% Irish, 5.8% English and 5.5% United States or American ancestry.

There were 7,210 households, out of which 28.30% had children under the age of 18 living with them, 52.50% were married couples living together, 7.40% had a female householder with no husband present, and 37.10% were non-families. 33.10% of all households were made up of individuals, and 15.00% had someone living alone who was 65 years of age or older. The average household size was 2.30 and the average family size was 2.94.

The county population contained 24.70% under the age of 18, 8.30% from 18 to 24, 24.70% from 25 to 44, 23.00% from 45 to 64, and 19.40% who were 65 years of age or older. The median age was 40 years. For every 100 females there were 96.60 males. For every 100 females age 18 and over, there were 93.70 males.

The median income for a household in the county was $30,510, and the median income for a family was $40,596. Males had a median income of $26,910 versus $19,785 for females. The per capita income for the county was $17,832. About 7.90% of families and 11.90% of the population were below the poverty line, including 14.20% of those under age 18 and 12.30% of those age 65 or over.

2010 census
As of the 2010 United States Census, there were 17,398 people, 7,276 households, and 4,509 families residing in the county. The racial makeup of the county was 89.7% white, 3.6% Asian, 1.1% American Indian, 0.8% black or African American, 0.1% Pacific islander, 3.0% from other races, and 1.6% from two or more races. Those of Hispanic or Latino origin made up 7.7% of the population. In terms of ancestry, 45.4% were German, 11.7% were Norwegian, 10.3% were Irish, 8.8% were English, and 4.1% were American.

Of the 7,276 households, 28.6% had children under the age of 18 living with them, 49.5% were married couples living together, 8.3% had a female householder with no husband present, 38.0% were non-families, and 33.0% of all households were made up of individuals. The average household size was 2.31 and the average family size was 2.92. The median age was 41.2 years.

The median income for a household in the county was $40,716 and the median income for a family was $56,288. Males had a median income of $37,020 versus $25,824 for females. The per capita income for the county was $23,409. About 6.3% of families and 13.1% of the population were below the poverty line, including 12.8% of those under age 18 and 12.5% of those age 65 or over.

Communities

Cities
 Huron (county seat)
 Iroquois (partial)
 Wessington (partial)

Towns

 Broadland
 Cavour
 Hitchcock
 Virgil
 Wolsey
 Yale

Census-designated places
 Huron Colony
 Morningside
 Pearl Creek Colony
 Riverside Colony
 Shamrock Colony

Townships

 Allen
 Altoona
 Banner
 Barrett
 Belle Prairie
 Bonilla
 Broadland
 Burr Oak
 Carlyle
 Cavour
 Clifton
 Clyde
 Custer
 Dearborn
 Fairfield
 Foster
 Grant
 Hartland
 Huron
 Iowa
 Kellogg
 Lake Byron
 Liberty
 Logan
 Milford
 Nance
 Pearl Creek
 Pleasant View
 Richland
 Sand Creek
 Theresa
 Valley
 Vernon
 Wessington
 Whiteside
 Wolsey

Politics
Beadle County has become more Republican in recent history. In 2000, George W. Bush won the county, ending a streak of Democratic-majority voting that began in 1990.

See also
National Register of Historic Places listings in Beadle County, South Dakota
The Old Timers by J. L. Carr

References

Bibliography
 J.L. Carr (1957) The Old Timers. A social history of the way of life of the home-steading pioneers in the Prairie States during the first few years of settlement, as shown by a typical community, the 'old-timers' of Beadle County in South Dakota. Huron, South Dakota: privately printed.

 
1880 establishments in Dakota Territory
Populated places established in 1880